Love and Duty is a 1931 Chinese silent film, directed by Bu Wancang and starring Ruan Lingyu and Jin Yan. Long considered lost, it was accidentally rediscovered in Uruguay in the 1990s, and almost immediately hailed as one of the greatest Chinese silent films. Like many Chinese silent films, it features both Chinese and English intertitles.

Ruan Lingyu portrays two different characters, and the split screen technology is used for scenes where both characters appear.

Production history
Based on a novel by Polish expatriate Stéphanie Rosenthal ("Ho Ro-se"), who had married a Chinese engineer, Love and Duty became one of the first films produced by the leftist Lianhua Film Company.

The film was very popular for its day, in no small part due to the pairing of Ruan, who was already a darling of the Shanghai film industry, and Jin Yan, a Korean-born actor who was one of the major leading men in early Chinese cinema.

Plot
The film tells the story of Yang Naifan (Ruan Lingyu) who runs from her arranged marriage to be with her true love, Li Zuyi (Jin Yan). The film details the poverty she must endure for breaking with tradition.

Rediscovery
For many years the film was believed to be lost, until a complete print was discovered in Uruguay in the 1990s. The rediscovered print was shipped over to Taiwan in 1993 and is now housed at the Taiwan Film and Audiovisual Institute. Since its rediscovery, the film has made its rounds in film festivals and Chinese cinema retrospectives around the world. In 2014, Love and Duty underwent a 2K digital restoration under Italy's L'Immagine Ritrovata, after which it was screened at the Shanghai Film Festival that same year.

Remakes
Love and Duty has been remade twice, in 1938 and 1955.  The first was from the wartime Shanghai "Orphan Island" studio Xinhua Film Company, again directed by Bu Wancang, with Jin Yan reprising his earlier role and Yuan Meiyun in the role originally created by Ruan Lingyu. The second remake was by the Hong Kong Shaw Brothers Studio.  Both remakes were Mandarin dialect sound films.

See also
List of rediscovered films

References

External links
 Love and Duty (1934): Full film with English subtitles representing text not translated in the original intertitles

Love and Duty profiled at the XVth EACS-Conference from the University of Heidelberg
Love and Duty at the Melbourne International Film Festival
"A Century Of Chinese Cinema"

1931 films
Chinese silent films
Films directed by Bu Wancang
Lianhua Film Company films
1930s rediscovered films
Chinese drama films
1931 drama films
Chinese black-and-white films
Silent drama films